Osterley is a London Underground station in Osterley in west London. The station is on the Heathrow branch of the Piccadilly line, between Boston Manor and Hounslow East. The station is located on Great West Road (A4) close to the National Trust-owned Osterley Park. It is in Travelcard Zone 4.

History
Osterley station opened on 25 March 1934. A station at Osterley had first opened in 1883 at Osterley & Spring Grove, located about 300m to the east on Thornbury Road. In June 1931, it had been decided to relocate the station to the west, to a site adjacent to the new Great West Road which had opened in 1925. Upon opening, the Osterley & Spring Grove station was closed, although the station building remained.

Designed in the modern European style used elsewhere on the Piccadilly line by Charles Holden, the station was designed by architect Stanley Heaps following a preliminary plan by Holden. The design uses brick, reinforced concrete and large areas of glass. The station also features a brick tower topped with a concrete "obelisk", possibly inspired by De Telegraaf Building in Amsterdam, which Holden visited as part of a study trip to the Netherlands. The Chief Executive of London Transport Frank Pick felt that stations designed by others that followed Holden's style lacked attention to detail – with Pick dubbing them 'Holdenesque'. The station was awarded listed building status in 1987, at Grade II.
Osterley station was a replacement for an earlier station, "Osterley & Spring Grove", located about 300m to the east on Thornbury Road, which was closed when Osterley opened. The old station buildings and platforms remain.

The station was served from its opening by trains from the District and Piccadilly lines, although District line services were withdrawn on 9 October 1964.

Step-free access
In 2009, because of financial constraints, Transport for London decided to stop work on a project to provide step-free access at Osterley on the grounds that it was a relatively quiet station and within one or two stops of an existing step-free station, Hounslow East where step-free access has been available since 2005.

In 2017, TfL announced that Osterley station would receive funding for step-free access, with work commencing in 2018. In October 2021, Osterley became the 89th step-free Tube station, following completion of works at the station to install two lifts.

Connections
London Buses route H91 serves the station.
Osterley is the closest tube station to Sky's offices near Gillette Corner. Sky runs a private shuttle bus service to and from the station every 15 minutes during extended office hours for visitors and staff.

Gallery

References

External links

 London Transport Museum Photographic Archive
 
 
 

Piccadilly line stations
London Underground Night Tube stations
Art Deco architecture in London
Tube stations in the London Borough of Hounslow
Railway stations in Great Britain opened in 1934
Art Deco railway stations
Charles Holden railway stations